WMTH-FM, located in Park Ridge, Illinois, was among the first FM high school radio stations in the United States when it was licensed in 1959. Established by the Student Council at Maine Township High School, now Maine East High School, the station went on the air during December 1959.  The station became known as "The Voice of Maine Township".

The radio station was built by electronics teacher, Theron Whitfield, and electronics students in the school.

WMTH-FM has studios at all three existing Maine Township High Schools; Maine West High School in Des Plaines and Maine East High School and Maine South High School in Park Ridge. There was also a studio at the former Maine North High School in Des Plaines.

Maine East, South, and West currently broadcast from about 8:30 AM - 5 PM on Weekdays, with East broadcasting on Mondays, South on Tuesdays, West on Wednesday, and the schools rotating Thursday and Friday every week.

The call letters were chosen "MTH" as in Maine Township High (school). The WMTH-FM antenna is located on the highest point of the school building at Dempster and Potter Roads in Park Ridge. The studio from 1959 through 1970 was located in room 147B, across the hall from the auditorium. When the center courtyard building opened in the fall of 1970, the radio station relocated and the first WMTH-TV television studio was built.

The original power of the station was 16 watts effective radiated power at a frequency of 88.5 MHz. This continued from 1960 until 1983 when the frequency was changed to 90.5 MHz and the power reduced to 10 watts. This leaves it as one of the lowest powered FM stations in the United States, and one of few remaining under the now-discontinued Class D license.

WMTH-TV is another section of WMTH, they broadcast a mixture of school news, school sports events, and other programs of local interest. All of the broadcast events are streamed on their respective YouTube channels. In addition, all events broadcast are staffed by WMTH Club Members and the broadcasts are in care of their respective instructors.

Famous alumni
 Harrison Ford (1960) Actor and film producer
 Marshall Seese (1960) TV Weather meteorologist on The Weather Channel (retired 2008)
 Steve Goodman (1963) Musician and composer
 Rich Koz (1970) Svengoolie Chicago and Me TV TV celebrity
 Michael Walcher (1970) TV News anchor, reporter
 Joseph Passarella (1972) Broadcasting Executive, Voice-over artist
 Scott Cohn (1978) CNBC TV journalist
 Janet Shamlian (1980) national correspondent NBC News
 Countless others are at television stations, radio station, cable-TV, and satellite radio stations

References

1. WMTH on the air December 1959

External links

WMTH-FM online via Streema
WMTH Alumni blog and online museum website
WMTH on-air schedule

High school radio stations in the United States
MTH
Radio stations established in 1959
1959 establishments in Illinois